Da Bomb may refer to:
 Da Bomb (album), by rap duo Kris Kross
 "Da Bomb" (song), a single from Kris Kross's album
 Drop da Bomb, a Swiss music organisation

See also 
 The Bomb (disambiguation)